Mary Jo Salter (born August 15, 1954) is an American poet, a co-editor of The Norton Anthology of Poetry and a professor in the Writing Seminars program at Johns Hopkins University.

Life
Salter was born in Grand Rapids, Michigan and was raised in Detroit and Baltimore, Maryland. She received her B.A. from Harvard University in 1976 and her M.A. from Cambridge University in 1978. In 1976, she participated in the Glascock Prize contest.

While at Harvard, she studied with the noted poet Elizabeth Bishop.  She has been an editor at the Atlantic Monthly and at The New Republic.

From 1984 to 2007, she taught at Mount Holyoke College and was, from 1995 to 2007, a vice-president of the Poetry Society of America.

She has two daughters, Emily and Hilary Leithauser.

She is on the editorial board of the literary magazine The Common, based at Amherst College.

Works

Books of poetry
 Henry Purcell in Japan, Knopf, 1985, 
 Unfinished Painting, Knopf, 1989, Lamont Selection for that year's most distinguished second volume of poetry
 Sunday Skaters, A.A. Knopf, 1994, nominated in 1994 for the National Book Critics Circle Award (Knopf)
 A Kiss in Space, Knopf, 1999, 
 Open Shutters, Alfred A. Knopf, 2003, named a "notable book of the year" by The New York Times
 A Phone Call to the Future: New and Selected Poems
 Nothing by Design, Knopf, 2013, 
 The Surveyors, Knopf, 2017,

Edited
The Norton Anthology of Poetry, W. W. Norton, 1996,  (co-editor)

Selected translations
The Word Exchange: Anglo-Saxon Poems in Translation (W. W. Norton & Company, 2010)

Play
Falling Bodies (2004)

Children's literature
The Moon Comes Home (1989)

Articles
The Achiever: Helen Keller by Mary Jo Salter

Awards
1981: The Frost Place poet in residence
1995–1996: Amy Lowell Poetry Travelling Scholarship
1989:  Lamont Poetry Prize for the year’s most distinguished second volume of poetry - Unfinished Painting
2003: Open Shutters named a "notable book of the year" by The New York Times
2004: Meribeth E. Cameron Faculty Award for Scholarship

References

External links
Johns Hopkins biography of Salter
Married Poets Craft Love Poems by the Clock
Library of Congress National Book Festival biography of Salter
Blue Flower Arts biography of Salter
Mount Holyoke College biography of Salter
Smith College biography of Salter
Borzoi interview

Poems online
 "Tromp l'Oeil", Blue Flower Arts
 "A Kiss in Space and A Rainbow Over the Seine"

1954 births
Living people
Writers from Grand Rapids, Michigan
Formalist poets
Mount Holyoke College faculty
Harvard University alumni
American women poets
Johns Hopkins University faculty
Alumni of the University of Cambridge
Poets from Michigan
Writers from Detroit
Writers from Baltimore
Poets from Maryland
20th-century American poets
20th-century American women writers
21st-century American poets
21st-century American women writers
American women academics